Music venues in the Netherlands are a vivid part of the social cultural environment of the country.

In every big city there are concert halls for popular music, classical music and jazz. The ten biggest dedicated music venues are Ziggo Dome, AFAS Live, Melkweg, Paradiso in Amsterdam, Paard van Troje in The Hague, Tivoli (TivoliVredenburg & Tivoli De Helling) in Utrecht , Patronaat in Haarlem, 013 in Tilburg, Effenaar in Eindhoven and Doornroosje in Nijmegen. Watt in Rotterdam has shut his doors in 2010.

In every middle sized town of city (approx. 100.000 inhabitants) there's a music venue for popular music genres. In the Netherlands about fifty of these music venues receive funding from the government following the advice of Muziek Centrum Nederland. Other venues are independent or subsidiarised by the cities themselves or are local social centres, community centres and cultural centres with a stage facilitating music performances.

Furthermore, there is a number of multifunctional venues (like Ahoy in Rotterdam, Westergasfabriek in Amsterdam, Doelen in Rotterdam or Oosterpoort in Groningen) which frequently host musical acts. Furthermore, a number of sportstadiums feature on the megaconcert circuit, foremost Amsterdam Arena, De Kuip in Rotterdam and Gelredome in Arnhem.

List of music venues

Arranged in alphabetical order per city

Alkmaar
 Popular music: Victorie
Amstelveen
 Popular music: P60
Amsterdam

 Classical music & Jazz: Concertgebouw, Muziekgebouw aan 't IJ, Bimhuis
 Jazz & Popular Music: Club Dauphine
 Popular music: AFAS Live, Melkweg, Paradiso, OCCII, OT301, De Nieuwe Anita, Ziggo Dome
 Electronic music: STEIM
Apeldoorn
 Popular music: De Gigant
Arnhem
 Popular music: Luxor, Willemeen, Gelredome
 Classical music: Musis Sacrum
 Former venues: Rijnhal
Bergen op Zoom
 Popular music: Gebouw-T
Breda
 Popular music: Mezz, Breepark
 Musicals: Chassé Theater
Den Bosch
 Popular music: Willem Twee Concertzaal, Brabanthallen, Podium Azijnfabriek, Verkadefabriek
 Classical music:Willem Twee Toonzaal
Deventer
 Popular music: Burgerweeshuis
Dordrecht
 Popular music: Bibelot
Drachten
 Popular music: Iduna
Eindhoven

 Populair music and upcoming talents in music: Dynamo Eindhoven

 Popular music: Effenaar

 Populair music: Klokgebouw Eindhoven op Strijp-S

 Classical music: Muziekgebouw Frits Philips
Emmeloord
 Popular music: De Klos
Enschede
 Popular music: Atak
Gouda
 Popular music: So What!
Groningen
 Popular music: Vera, Simplon, De Oosterpoort
 Experimental music/sound art: Galerie Sign
Haarlem

 Popular music: Patronaat
The Hague
 Classical music: Dr. Anton Philipszaal
 Popular Music: Paard van Troje, De Supermarkt
Helmond
 Popular music: Plato
Hilversum
 Popular music: De Vorstin
Hoorn
 Popular music: Manifesto
Kaatsheuvel
 Popular music: Crossroads Kaatsheuvel
 Popular music: Gildebond
 Popular music: Het Klavier
 Musicals: Efteling Theatre 
Leeuwarden
 Popular music: Muziekcentrum Schaaf, Romeijn, Asteriks
Leiden
 Popular music: LVC
 Upcoming talents: De Nobel
Lierop
 Popular music: Nirwana
Nijmegen
 Classical music: Concertgebouw de Vereeniging
 Popular music: Doornroosje, Merleijn
 Experimental music: Extrapool
Rotterdam

 Classical music: De Doelen
 Popular music: Ahoy, Bird, Rotown, The Player, Waterfront, Luxor Theater
 Experimental music: WORM
 Alternative music: Baroeg, Poortgebouw
 Former venues: WATT, Nighttown, Blokhut
Sittard
 Popular music: Volt
Sneek
Popular music: Het Bolwerk
Tilburg
 Large concert hall: 013, 
 Popular music: Theaters Tilburg, Cul de Sac
 Jazz: Paradox Tilburg
 Classical music: Het Cenakel
 Alternative Music: Little Devil, Extase 
 Former venues: Noorderligt, Attak tilburgUden:
 Popular music: De Pul
Utrecht:

 Large concert hall: TivoliVredenburg
 Jazz: SJU Jazz
 Popular music: De Helling, EKKO, ACU, DBs, De Vechtclub, Kargadoor
 World Music: RASA
 Former venues: Tivoli, Muziekcentrum Vredenburg''
Waalwijk
 Popular music: De Broertjes
 Popular music: De Leest
 Popular music: De Mads
Weert:
 Popular music: De Bosuil
Zaandam
 Popular music: De Kade
Zoetermeer
 Popular music: De Boerderij
Zwolle
 Popular music: IJsselhallen, Hedon

See also
Dutch rock

 
Concert halls in the Netherlands
Dutch culture